The Osoyoos Indian Band is a First Nations government in the Canadian province of British Columbia, located in the town of Oliver and Osoyoos in the Okanagan valley, approximately four kilometres (2½ miles) north of the Canada–United States border. They are a member of the ×Okanagan Nation Alliance. The band controls about 32,000 acres of land in the vicinity of the town of Oliver and Osoyoos.

The band's Nk'Mip Desert Cultural Centre (pronounced “in-Ka-meep”) is located on the east side of Osoyoos. The centre gives tours in the arid region (similar to desert, but actually shrub-steppe) and explains the uniqueness of the plant species found there. The current chief of the band is Clarence Louie. Louie has pushed for economic self-reliance by expanding investments, including a vineyard and winery, a four-star resort, and a 9-hole golf course.

There are more than 600 band members who live and work on the reserve.

Gallery

See also
Okanagan people

External links
Osoyoos Indian Band website

References

Okanagan
Syilx governments

 Lolz